Jung Ho-jin (born May 30, 1984) is a South Korean football player who played for Samut Songkhram.

External links
 
 profile at Goal
 profile at Thaisoccernet

1984 births
Living people
South Korean footballers
South Korean expatriate footballers
Expatriate footballers in Thailand
South Korean expatriate sportspeople in Thailand
Gimcheon Sangmu FC players
Daegu FC players
Association football central defenders